Novosyolka is a rural locality (a village) in Yesiplevskoye Rural Settlement, Kolchuginsky District, Vladimir Oblast, Russia. The population was 61 as of 2010.

Geography 
The village is located on the Ilmovka River, 3 km south from Yesiplevo, 12 km east Kolchugino.

References 

Rural localities in Kolchuginsky District